Paul Patrick Rodil Gruenberg (born June 27, 1982), simply known as Polo Ravales, is a Filipino actor and model. Engaged to Paulyn Quiza, a fitness coach and Managing Director of their International Manpower family business.

Career

Ravales' first TV appearance came in 1996 as one of second batch members in the teen show T.G.I.S. He is a former VIVA contract star along with fellow GMA stars Sunshine Dizon, Dingdong Dantes and among others. A year later, he landed a small role in the drama series Anna Karenina as Vincent. Then followed by several soap series, Click, Ang Iibigin ay Ikaw, and Hanggang Kailan'

In 2005, he landed his first big role in the hit telefantasya series Encantadia as Hitano, which followed by Majika. He starred in a number of successful movies in the Philippines, including Blue Moon and Super Noypi. In 2008, he was Patrick Garcia's replacement for the role of Andy Abrigo in Sine Novela: Maging Akin Ka Lamang opposite Nadine Samonte. The role he reprised was originally played by Christopher De Leon and was his biggest break in TV. After this, he joins the cast of Gagambino. In 2009, Ravales played Shiro in Darna. Polo was part of the GMA Dramedy show, Adik Sa'Yo.

In 2010, Ravales appeared in Panday Kids. He was also seen in other GMA shows like Sine Novela: Basahang Ginto which he plays Anton, he guested in Claudine Presents: Love Thy Neighbor which he plays a rich driver with his co-stars Claudine Barreto, and former love team and now long-time friend Sunshine Dizon, and also recently seen on Grazilda, in which appears as Matthew Dominguez. In 2011, he joined a former Drama series Sinner Or Saint. He began a new show,  Hiram na Puso, which sometimes airs this March 5, 2012, on GMA 7. In 2014 he went back to acting in film for cinema playing the role of Franco, a violent husband in Sinners and Saints, directed by Fil-Italian director Ruben Maria Soriquez.

In 2015, Ravales was seen in Ipaglaban Mo! and FPJ's Ang Probinsyano which airs on ABS-CBN followed by the fourth season of Doble Kara.

In 2016, he is currently a freelancer artist.

In 2018, Polo Ravales joined ABS-CBN’s La Luna Sangre. Presently, November 2019, he reverted back to his home station GMA 7 for the show Magkaagaw.

Filmography
FilmWapakmanWalang KawalaLoving YouManay Po 2: OverloadSilipSuper NoypiPacquiao: The MovieManay PoBlue MoonRoom BoyLet The Love BeginSusmaryosep! Four FathersKiss Mo 'KoHoney, My Love, So SweetMoises Arcangel: Sa Guhit ng Bala''

Television

References

External links
 
Polo Ravales' iGMA Profile (archived)
https://news.abs-cbn.com/entertainment/12/26/18/polo-ravales-proposes-to-girlfriend-on-christmas-day

1982 births
Living people
21st-century Filipino male actors
Male actors from Manila
Filipino male television actors
Filipino male film actors
Filipino male models
Filipino people of German descent
Filipino Roman Catholics
GMA Network personalities
ABS-CBN personalities